Nikolai Alexandrovich Serno-Solovyevich (13 December 1834 in Saint Petersburg, Imperial Russia – 14 February 1866 in Irkutsk) was a Russian publicist and revolutionary who was one of the founders of the far-left organisation Zemlya i Volya.

A radical who rejected both the 1861 reforms and capitalism, seeing revolution as the only way forward for Russia, he was a regular correspondent to different publications of the Free Russian Press. A friend of Alexander Hertzen and Nikolai Ogaryov, as well as Nikolai Chernyshevsky, he became a pivotal link between the Saint Petersburg and the London centres of the Russian revolutionary movement. Arrested on 7 July 1862 alongside Chernyshevsky and taken to the Petropavlovskaya Fortress where he remained until 1865, Serno was deported to Siberia and died in 1866 in Irkutsk.

References 

1834 births
1866 deaths
Journalists from the Russian Empire
Politicians from Saint Petersburg
Russian nihilists
Russian revolutionaries